Purwantoro is one of the districts in Wonogiri Regency, Indonesia. It is located at the eastern border of Wonogiri and is also signed as the border between Jawa Tengah and Jawa Timur.

Districts of Central Java